Prince Sethati was the fifth son of King Tsotetsi who was the leader of Batlokwa ba Mokgalong in the mid-1700s, from which they trace their history. Sethati gave birth to three children namely Makume, Mokgitlinyane and Mankane.  Sethati was born in the Nts'oana-Tsatsi, Tafelkop area in the Free State are and most of his descendants are in South Africa and Lesotho area.

South Africa
In South Africa, the descendants of Sethati are found mostly in the Eastern Free State Area, namely in the Frankfort, Villiers, Tweeling, Cornelia, Heidelberg and Qwa-Qwa area.  Due to migrant labour, you find large groups of Sethati people in Gauteng area.

Lesotho
In Lesotho, the Sethati clan is found in the Mokhotlong District, particularly in the Mapholaneng Village, which is some 250 km away from Maseru.

18th-century rulers in Africa
Botswana royalty
People from Limpopo